Mohamed bin Jaafar is a Malaysian politician and currently serves as Deputy Speaker of the Pahang State Legislative Assembly.

Election Results

Honours

Honours of Malaysia
  :
  Officer of the Order of the Defender of the Realm (KMN) (1999)
  :
  Knight Companion of the Order of the Crown of Pahang (DIMP) - Dato' (2000)
  Grand Knight of the Order of Sultan Ahmad Shah of Pahang (SSAP) - Dato' Sri (2015)

References

United Malays National Organisation politicians
Members of the Pahang State Legislative Assembly
21st-century Malaysian politicians
Officers of the Order of the Defender of the Realm
Living people
Year of birth missing (living people)
People from Pahang
Malaysian people of Malay descent
Malaysian Muslims